The Elrington and Bosworth Professorship of Anglo-Saxon is the senior professorship in Anglo-Saxon at the University of Cambridge.

The first chair was elected in 1878, when a gift endowed in 1867 by Joseph Bosworth, Rawlinsonian Professor of Anglo-Saxon at Oxford, had increased in value sufficiently to support a stipend of £500 a year. It was named after its creator and his wife, Anne Elliot, ex-wife of Colonel Hamilton Elrington. The professor holding this chair is traditionally the head of the Department of Anglo-Saxon, Norse and Celtic, University of Cambridge.

Elrington and Bosworth Professors
Walter William Skeat (1878–1912)
Hector Munro Chadwick (1912–1941)
Bruce Dickins (1946–1957)
Dorothy Whitelock (1957–1969)
Peter Alan Martin Clemoes (1969–1982)
Raymond Ian Page (1984–1991)
Michael Lapidge (1991–1999)
Simon Douglas Keynes (1999–2019)
Rosalind Love (2019–present)

References 

Anglo-Saxon, Elrington and Bosworth
School of Arts and Humanities, University of Cambridge
1878 establishments in England
Anglo-Saxon, Elrington and Bosworth, Cambridge